Paresh Rawal is an Indian actor who appeared primarily in Hindi,Telugu and a few Tamil and Gujarati films.

Filmography

References

External links
 

Male actor filmographies
Indian filmographies